Hannevikåsen is a neighbourhood in the city of Kristiansand in Agder county, Norway. It is located in the borough of Grim and in the district of Tinnheia. It lies up the hill from Hannevika and Kolsdalen. The European route E39 highway runs underneath the south end of the neighborhood.

References

Geography of Kristiansand
Neighbourhoods of Kristiansand